Hans Johansson (20 February 1927 – 15 April 2012) was a Swedish equestrian. He competed at the 1960 Summer Olympics.

References

External links
 

1927 births
2012 deaths
Swedish male equestrians
Olympic equestrians of Sweden
Equestrians at the 1960 Summer Olympics
Sportspeople from Norrköping